Kaganda is a settlement in Kenya's Central Province. Kaganda is one of the Sublocations in murarandia location Kahuro District.

References 

Populated places in Central Province (Kenya)